Dnyaneshwar Agashe (IAST: Jñāneśvara Āgāśe; 17 April 1942 – 2 January 2009) was an Indian businessman, cricketer, cricket administrator and philanthropist. He is best remembered for founding the Suvarna Sahakari Bank in 1969, and the scandal following the bank's alleged scam case in 2008. He played first-class cricket for Maharashtra between 1962 and 1968, and served as managing director of the Brihan Maharashtra Sugar Syndicate from 1986 to 1996. He was twice elected vice president of Board of Control for Cricket in India, serving his second and final term from 1995 to 1999.

Biography

Early life, education and family: 1942–1967
Agashe was born in Pune, Bombay Presidency on 17 April 1942, into an aristocratic and entrepreneurial Chitpavan brahmin family of industrialist Chandrashekhar Agashe and wife Indirabai Agashe (née Dwarka Gokhale). His father was a member of the aristocratic Agashe gharana of the village of Mangdari in the Bhor State. He was the third youngest of nine siblings who survived to adulthood. He had an older brother, Panditrao Agashe. His fraternal twin, Mukta, died a few months after birth. His sisters nicknamed him Shirin, as a child.

Agashe's mother was the daughter of Narayan Gokhale VI from the aristocratic Gokhale gharana of Dharwad. She was a great niece of Bapu Gokhale, a Third Anglo-Maratha War general under Peshwa Baji Rao II of the Maratha Empire. Through her, Agashe was a distant relation of musician Ashutosh Phatak, historian Dinkar G. Kelkar, and scientist P. K. Kelkar.

Agashe grew up between Pune, Shreepur, and Mangdari. Him and his siblings were in Mangdari during the anti-Brahmin riots that followed Gandhi's assassination in 1948. The family's wada, called Chausopi, along with the family's Ram temple was burned down. He began his schooling at the Nutan Marathi Vidyalaya in Pune. In his fifth grade, he transferred to the Deccan Education Society's Raman Baug High School in Pune. He graduated with a Bachelor of Arts degree from Sir Parshurambhau College in 1964. After briefly considering law at ILS Law College, he further graduated with a Bachelor of Commerce degree from Brihan Maharashtra College of Commerce.

Agashe married Rekha Gogte in 1967, a niece of B. M. Gogte. She was also a descendant of the aristocratic Latey (Bhagwat) family. Through her, Agashe was a relation of Kokuyo Camlin head Dilip Dandekar, and academic Jyoti Gogte. The couple had three children, including sons Mandar and Ashutosh Agashe.

Career in cricket: 1955–1968
While at Raman Baug High School, Agashe took an interest in cricket, field hockey, football, and badminton. Under the guidance of his school's sports coach Rambhau Lele, he began playing hockey as a center-forward. 

Known for his unorthodox batting with lofted shots, Agashe was a part of his school's cricket team which won the Sethna Cup and the Pudumjee Shield against Shri Shivaji Preparatory Military School. Between 1955 and 1957, he was selected for the Pune district cricket team and then for the Maharashtra cricket team to play the Cooch Behar Trophy. He further sought training at the National Defense Academy before being selected as a wicket-keeper-batsman for the West Zone cricket team. While a West Zone player, his performance in the matches in Calcutta got him selected for the Indian Universities cricket team to tour Sri Lanka.

Between 1962 and 1968, Agashe played first-class cricket for the Maharashtra cricket team as a wicket-keeper-batsman, and scored two half-centuries in 13 matches. He played his best season in 1964–65 where he made his career-best 75, took ten catches and made two stumpings, and was credited for Maharashtra's victory against the Nari Contractor captained Gujarat cricket team in the 1964 season. His teammates at the time were Chandu Borde, Sadanand Mohol, and Hemant Kanitkar.

Career in business and cricket administration: 1969–2006
Agashe's father had founded the Brihan Maharashtra Sugar Syndicate in 1934. After his father's death in 1956, the syndicate was headed by S. L. Limaye as chairman of the board of directors of the company from 1959 till 1990, while K. V. Champhekar took over as managing director of the company from 1957 to 1962, followed by G. S. Valimbe from 1963 to 1969, with Agashe joining the board of directors for the company in 1966, and launching new branches of the factory near Akluj. He also joined the Maharashtra Cricket Association in 1969.

Beginning in 1969, Agashe founded the Suvarna Sahakari Bank in Pune for the banking purposes of mainly middle-class families. In July 1970, Agashe and his brother became joint managing directos of the Brihan Maharashtra Sugar Syndicate. Beginning in the 1970s, under Agashe and his brother, the syndicate manufactured liquor in Shreepur, Maharashtra, specialising in whisky production under its several flagship brands. During the Maharashtra drought of 1972, Agashe and his brother lent their water stream on their Mangdari estate to the Bhor district for the construction of a tap water system for the village. In 1973, Agashe and his brother donated an exhibit named after their father to the Raja Dinkar Kelkar Museum. In 1977, Agashe and his brother aided Shivrampant Damle in founding the Chandrashekhar Agashe College of Physical Education in honour of their father. In 1978, Agashe became the sole managing director of the Brihan Maharashtra Sugar Syndicate upon his brother's retirement from the office.

By 1985, Agashe worked as a promoter for several cricket matches and tournaments within India, as well as in the United Kingdom and the Middle East. In January 1986, he interviewed S. L. Kirloskar for the Mahratta Chamber of Commerce, Industries and Agriculture. He donated to the Maharashtra Vidya Mandal after his brother Panditrao's death in November 1986, after whom the Panditrao Agashe School was named. He also founded the Chandrashekhar Agashe High School, Chandrashekhar Agashe Junior College and Indirabai Agashe High School on the family's estate in the town of Shreepur, Maharashtra. In 1987, Agashe was part of the inquiry made by Shankarrao Chavan about Sharad Pawar's foreign assets. He served as chairman to Kolhapur Steel, after the syndicate had begun work in matal printing under his brother in the early 1980s. He started a unit in Canada for Taj Rum by the late 1980s. He diversified the syndicate into pharmaceuticals, power generation, publication (with Mandar Printing Press), and real estate by the early 1990s.  In 1987, he was one of the managers for the Indian cricket team's tour of  the  United Kingdom. In 1989, he was elected to the post of executive chairman for the Maharashtra Cricket Association. 

In 1990, Agashe took over as chairman of the board of directors for the syndicate upon the death of S. L. Limaye. In 1993, Agashe was invited to open the Deodhar Entrance to the Nehru Stadium, Pune. In 1994, he provided financial assistance to Société géologique de France for their research. During his tenure as chairman of the association in the early 1990s, he was twice elected as the vice president and once as the treasurer of the Board of Control for Cricket in India, being elected for his second term as vice president in 1995. In 1996, he had also contested for the post of BCCI's president, but lost by two votes. That same year, he was also the vice chairman of the finance committee of the Pakistan-India-Lanka Joint Management Committee (Pilcom), which had organised the 1996 World Cup. The late 1990s also saw Agashe diversify the syndicate and bank businesses to incorporate country liquor and banking software, alongside research into sugarcane for the syndicate. In 1996, he stepped down as managing director of the syndicate in favour of his son, Ashutosh.

By 2000, Agashe was also on the board of the Deccan Education Society. In April 2002, a felicitation ceremony was held in Pune, in honour of Agashe's 60th birthday. To further mark the occasion, a motorcycle rally was organised on Jangali Maharaj Road, Pune, and a festschrift on him was published. That same year, He was invited as a keynote speaker to the 75th Akhil Bharatiya Marathi Sahitya Sammelan under the presidency of Rajendra Banhatti.

Agashe served a record seventh term as executive chairman of the Maharashtra Cricket Association, being elected in April 2003. He was also a voting member of the Mumbai Cricket Association, and served as the vice chair of the National Cricket Academy. Amid factionalism disputes at the Maharashtra Cricket Association, a nine member interim committee was formed in 2003; this committee was dissolved in 2004, and Agashe was reinstated as chairman of the association. Later that same year, he was denied participation in the annual general meeting of the BCCI due to further alleged factional disputes by then BCCI President Jagmohan Dalmiya. He was later denied his right to vote in the Board's elections that year by Dalmia, which saw Sharad Pawar losing by one vote to the post of the BCCI's president. Some sources at the time claimed Agashe's actions (delay to vote) may have been deliberate. Agashe moved court countermanding the elections, alleging that the absence of his vote ensured an unfair victory to Dalmiya nominee Ranbir Singh Mahendra. The Madras High Court stated a prima facie case against the elections, with Agashe expressing satisfaction with the court's decision. That same year, Agashe was elected the president of the Poona Youth Club. 

In 2005, the Maharashtra Cricket Association was gripped in a power struggle between Agashe and Ajay Shirke. That year's Maharashtra Cricket Association election was in sight of a reformed regulation scheme recommendations between the two parties, which was won by Shirke. Agashe had served a record seventh term at the time of his ousting from the position. Critics claimed that the court cases between the two parties were responsible for a lack luster cricketing season in Pune that year.

In August 2006, Agashe served as president through the Poona Youth Club's liquor controversy, resigning the presidency in September, after his third year as president of the club.

Suvarna Sahakari Bank scam allegations: 2006–2008

By 2006, the Suvarna Sahakari Bank started having financial troubles, with some sources alleging that the bank's failure was backlash for the controversial BCCI presidency elections of 2004. In September of that same year, the cooperative bank was put under moratorium by the Reserve Bank of India. In 2007, following the order of moratorium, many of the bank's depositors held demonstrations at Agashe's Aundh residence and threatened criminal actions against the Agashe family, after which a speedy merger was promised by Agashe, when Cosmos Bank planned to acquire the bank. In May 2008, Agashe mortgaged personal property worth Rs. 200 crore in lieu of the recovery of the deposits worth Rs. 725 crore. Hotel Ranjeet, a hotel owned by Agashe was auctioned off for the same reasons. 

On 22 November 2008, Agashe along with 14 other board members was taken into judicial custody; the bank business was charged with a Rs. 436.74 crore scam allegation. The arresting police stated that Agashe along with six others allegedly misused their rights and sanctioned loans mostly to firms owned by themselves and then defaulted the loans, thereby duping the depositors. The judicial magistrate remanded Agashe and the 14 other suspects to police custody, with provisions of medical assistance if required, citing the senior citizenship of a majority of the accused.

In December 2008, the economics offenses wing of the crime branch conducted a raid of Agashe's Aundh residence to recover Rs. 1.5 lakhs. The prosecution stated that upon discovery of the money, further interrogation of the accused was necessary and alleged that the accused had disbursed loans to people close to them by flouting RBI rules. In return, Agashe's defense counsel claimed that Agashe and his family had sold off various properties for the repayment of the loan. The defense counsel also stated that the Agashe family had extended full cooperation with the police and submitted that the family would repay another Rs. 80 crore after the issue of Suvarna's merger was settled. The defense also raised the issue of foul play, when the first information reporting of the allegations was not produced before the court three days after registering the case and further contended that the loans had been sanctioned by the bank's disbursement committee, a committee Agashe was not a member of. The bail applications filed at the time for Agashe, his wife, and his sister were subsequently rejected.

Death and legacy: 2009
While in judicial custody, Agashe's health deteriorated and he was admitted to Sassoon Hospital on 22 December 2009, suffering from severe diabetes and gangrene, for which he had previously been denied medical assistance. He died on 2 January 2009, at the age of 66. He died in the ICU from a heart attack while being treated for diabetic complications. A condolence meet following Agashe's death was held at the Poona Youth Club, at the Maharashtra Cricket Association, and his family's residence in Shaniwar Peth. Agashe's son Ashutosh succeeded him as chairman of the board of directors and as managing director of the Brihan Maharashtra Sugar Syndicate.

The bank's case continued after Agashe's death, with the bank being dissolved and merged with the Indian Overseas Bank in May 2009. In 2015, Agashe's son, Ashutosh, conceived the Dnyaneshwar Agashe Trophy as the highest award of merit at the Poona Youth Club's annual cricket tournament, the PYC Premier League, in honor of Agashe.

References

Bibliography

Further reading

External links
 
 

Marathi people
Indian bankers
Indian cricketers
1942 births
2009 deaths
Indian cricket administrators
Businesspeople from Pune
Indian industrialists
Cricketers from Pune
Indian Hindus
20th-century Indian philanthropists
Businesspeople from Maharashtra
20th-century Indian businesspeople
21st-century Indian businesspeople
Indian company founders